Dibutylchloromethyltin chloride (DBCT) is a toxic organotin compound. It's a potent and irreversible ATP synthase inhibitor. DBCT is a volatile liquid with powerful vesicant effects.

See also
Tributyltin chloride
Oligomycin

References

ATP synthase inhibitors
Organotin compounds
Organochlorides
Blister agents
Tin(IV) compounds